1000 Miles may refer to:

Music
"1000 Miles" (Grinspoon song)
"1000 Miles" (H.E.A.T song)
"Thousand Miles" (Destine song)
"Thousand Miles" (The Kid Laroi song)
"A Thousand Miles", Vanessa Carlton song
1000 Miles Away, 1991 song by Australian rock group Hoodoo Gurus
1000 Miles Per Hour

Books
A Thousand Miles to Freedom: My Escape from North Korea, by Eunsun Kim

See also

Rally 1000 Miglia or Rally 1000 Miles, a 1000-mile rally race
1000 Miles Apart
Thousand Mile Tree
Thousand Mile Stare
Thousand mile stare
A Thousand Miles Behind
A Thousand Miles from Nowhere